Selvarajah may refer to

Nadarajah Selvarajah, Sri Lankan Tamil writer
Selvarasa Pathmanathan, Tamil rebel also known as Selvarajah Pathmanathan.
Selvarajah Yogachandran, Tamil rebel known as Kuttimani
Selvarajah Rajivarnam, Sri Lankan Tamil journalist.
Relangi Selvarajah, Sri Lankan  Tamil broadcaster
Selvarajah Kajendran, Sri Lankan Tamil politician.

Tamil masculine given names